The 1964-65 NBA season was the Knicks' 19th season in the NBA.

Roster

Regular season

Season standings

x – clinched playoff spot

Record vs. opponents

Game log

Awards and records
Willis Reed, NBA Rookie of the Year Award
Willis Reed, NBA All-Rookie Team 1st Team
Jim Barnes, NBA All-Rookie Team 1st Team
Howard Komives, NBA All-Rookie Team 1st Team

References

New York Knicks seasons
New York
New York Knicks
New York Knicks
1960s in Manhattan
Madison Square Garden